Challenger banks are small, recently created retail banks that compete directly with the longer-established banks in the UK, sometimes by specialising in areas underserved by the "big four" banks (Barclays, HSBC, Lloyds Banking Group, and NatWest Group). As well as new entrants to the market, some challenger banks were created following divestment from larger banking groups (TSB Bank from Lloyds Banking Group) or wind-down of a failed large bank (Virgin Money from Northern Rock).

The banks distinguish themselves from the historic banks by modern financial technology practices, such as online-only operations, that avoid the costs and complexities of traditional banking.

History 

Prior to changes in the regulatory landscape in the UK financial services industry, setting up a new bank, with a full UK banking licence, was extremely expensive and time-consuming. This led to a very small number of banks dominating the UK market—the so-called Big Four—with virtually no competition at all. Indeed, when Metro Bank received their license in 2010, it was the first new high street bank for 100 years.

In the wake of the 2008 financial crisis, it was decided to open the market up to new banks. After a period of consultation, the regulation to enable this formed part of the Financial Services Act 2012, which came into force on 1 April 2013. A summary and assessment from Harvard Law School can be accessed online.

To assist new firms to enter the banking market, the PRA, part of the Bank of England, set up their New Bank Start-up Unit which guides firms through the process from an expression of interest, through the application process, to 'authorisation with restrictions' if appropriate, and finally to those restrictions being lifted and the firm being granted a full banking license.

In July 2014, the PRA, together with their co-regulators, the Financial Conduct Authority published a review of the requirements, one year on.

List of challenger banks 
This list contains companies that received authorisation from the PRA to operate as banks in the UK.

See also

 Banking in the United Kingdom
 List of banks in the United Kingdom
 Neobank
 Payments bank

External links
 List of authorised UK start-up banks , by the Bank of England

References 

Banks of the United Kingdom
Online banks